Titanium(IV) fluoride is the inorganic compound with the formula TiF4.  It is a white hygroscopic solid. In contrast to the other tetrahalides of titanium, it adopts a polymeric structure.  In common with the other tetrahalides, TiF4 is a strong Lewis acid.

Preparation, structure, reactions
The traditional method involves treatment of titanium tetrachloride with excess hydrogen fluoride:
TiCl4 + 4 HF → TiF4 + 4 HCl
Purification is by sublimation, which involves reversible cracking of the polymeric structure.
X-ray crystallography reveals that the Ti centres are octahedral, but conjoined in an unusual columnar structure.

TiF4 forms adducts with many ligands. One example is cis-TiF4(MeCN)2, which is formed by treatment with acetonitrile.

References

Fluorides
Titanium halides
Titanium(IV) compounds